Fordham Township is a township in Clark County, in the U.S. state of South Dakota.

History
Fordham Township has the name of Silas Fordham, a pioneer settler.

References

Townships in Clark County, South Dakota
Townships in South Dakota